Hull is a city in Madison County, Georgia, United States. The population was 230 at the 2020 census, up from 198 in 2010.

History
The Georgia General Assembly incorporated Hull as a town in 1905. The community most likely was named after Reverend Hope Hull, a Methodist Church leader.

Geography
Hull is located in southwestern Madison County at  (34.013201, -83.294470). It is bordered to the southwest by Clarke County (the city of Athens).

Georgia State Route 72 passes through the center of town, leading southwest  to the center of Athens and east-northeast  to Colbert.

The city sits on a ridge which is drained to the north by South Creek and to the south by Sulphur Spring Branch, both part of the watershed of the South Fork of the Broad River and of the Savannah River basin.

Hull is known as "The Well City", from a long-standing water well in the center of town.

Demographics

As of the census of 2000, there were 160 people, 70 households, and 42 families residing in the city. The racial makeup of the city was 86.88% White, 8.12% African American, 0.62% Native American, 4.38% from other races. Hispanic or Latino of any race were 5.00% of the population.

There were 70 households, out of which 31.4% had children under the age of 18 living with them, 41.4% were married couples living together, 12.9% had a female householder with no husband present, and 38.6% were non-families. 31.4% of all households were made up of individuals, and 7.1% had someone living alone who was 65 years of age or older. The average household size was 2.29 and the average family size was 2.84.

In the city, the population was spread out, with 25.0% under the age of 18, 10.0% from 18 to 24, 30.0% from 25 to 44, 22.5% from 45 to 64, and 12.5% who were 65 years of age or older. The median age was 35 years. For every 100 females, there were 102.5 males. For every 100 females age 18 and over, there were 110.5 males.

The median income for a household in the city was $31,250, and the median income for a family was $30,417. Males had a median income of $25,625 versus $19,792 for females. The per capita income for the city was $13,942. About 18.9% of families and 20.1% of the population were below the poverty line, including 23.3% of those under the age of eighteen and 33.3% of those 65 or over.

References

Cities in Georgia (U.S. state)
Cities in Madison County, Georgia
Athens – Clarke County metropolitan area